René Delacroix (August 27, 1900 - June 11, 1976) was a French film director and screenwriter. He was most noted for a mid-career period from 1949 to 1954 when he was based in Montreal, during which he directed or co-directed several of the most important early feature films in the Cinema of Quebec. The film Tit-Coq, codirected with Gratien Gélinas, won the Canadian Film Award for Film of the Year at the 5th Canadian Film Awards in 1953.

Filmography
La relève - 1932
Meute et kangourous... - 1935
Promesses - 1939
Notre-Dame de la Mouise - 1941, writer only
The Murderer Is Not Guilty (L'assassin n'est pas coupable) - 1946
Gonzague - 1947
The Grand Bill (Le Gros Bill) - 1949, with Jean-Yves Bigras
The Story of Dr. Louise (On ne triche pas la vie) - 1949, with Paul Vandenberghe
Ils ont vingt ans - 1950
The Nightingale and the Bells (Le Rossignol et les cloches) - 1952
Tit-Coq - 1953, with Gratien Gélinas
A Mother's Heart - 1953
The Heartthrob (Le Tombeur) - 1958

References

External links

1900 births
1976 deaths
20th-century French screenwriters
French male screenwriters
French film directors
Film directors from Montreal
Film directors from Paris
Writers from Montreal
Writers from Paris
French emigrants to Canada